Marjane may refer to:

People
Léo Marjane (1912-2016), French singer
Marjane Satrapi (born 1969), Iranian-born French graphic novelist, cartoonist, illustrator, film director, and children's book author.

Others
Marjan hill, hill on the peninsula of the city of Split, largest city of Croatia's Dalmatia region
"Marjane, Marjane" (lit. "Marjan, Marjan"), Croatian song from Dalmatia. 
Marjane (business), Moroccan hypermarket chain

See also
Marjan (disambiguation)